The Mall at Whitney Field (formerly known as Searstown Mall) is a shopping mall located off of Route 2 near the junction with Interstate 190 in Leominster, Massachusetts. The mall opened in 1967 and was renovated and renamed in 2004. The mall's anchor stores are Burlington, Gardner Outlet Furniture, and JCPenney with one vacant anchor last occupied by Sears. The mall was previously owned by Walton Street Capital LLC of Chicago until May 2013 when Vintage Real Estate acquired the mall with plans to renovate and turnaround the struggling mall. As of January 8, 2020, the mall is now owned by Hull Property Group.

History

The Mall at Whitney Field opened in 1967 as the "Searstown Mall". The mall originally opened with Sears, R. H. White, and Bradlees as anchors. DeMoulas (Market Basket) was next to Bradlees with an outside entrance and was eventually converted to a Toys "R" Us. The mall was expanded substantially in the 1980s adding a long wing created from the closed R. H. White building, leading to a new JCPenney store. In 1992 Sage-Allen closed their store at the mall and was replaced by a Service Merchandise store. Around that time, Toys "R" Us built a store that was attached to Bradlees, but only had an exterior entrance. Market Basket is now located on an outlot.  In 1999, more changes came to the mall. Service Merchandise closed their store in 1999 and as a result, the long side wing leading to their old store emptied out. In 2000, the mall big-boxed the wing turning much of it into an Old Navy store along with replacing Service Merchandise with a Circuit City store. After Bradlees departure in 2001, the mall was left with a large vacancy. The former Bradlees store was later demolished in 2002 and its former mall entrance was replaced with an outdoor entrance to the mall. In the same year, Filene's opened a large two-level store at the mall, one entrance down from the former Bradlees store.

In 2004, the mall was extensively renovated and renamed to "The Mall at Whitney Field", most likely an attempt to bring shoppers to the mall from the more affluent I-495 suburbs, rather than only bringing in shoppers from the immediate cities of Fitchburg and Leominster. In 2007, The Mall at Whitney Field was sold for $82 million to Walton Street Capital LLC of Chicago with Jones Lang LaSalle continuing as the mall's manager.

Circuit City was later closed and replaced with Ultimate Electronics in 2010. The chain went out of business a year later. Steve & Barry's became Jo-Ann Fabrics in 2010.

In 2013, The mall changed ownership once again. The mall was sold from Walton Street Capital LLC of Chicago to California-based Vintage Real Estate for an undisclosed price. Vintage Real Estate bought the center with plans to renovate and turnaround the struggling mall.  They also took over management from Jones Lang LaSalle. Immediately after Vintage Real Estate acquired the mall, they announced the signing of a ten-year lease with Burlington Coat Factory to occupy the former Circuit City space that has been vacant for years. 

Old Navy, which used to have only an exterior entrance, moved into a vacant space inside the mall in order to accommodate the addition of Burlington Coat Factory. The new store opened in 2014 and has both interior and exterior entrances.

On March 14, 2018, Toys "R" Us announced that they will be closing all 800 locations in the U.S. due to bankruptcy. The store closed on June 29, 2018.

In August 2018, Jones Lang LaSalle once again took over management of the mall.

In March 2019, Gardner Outlet Furniture opened in the former Toys "R" Us space.

On November 7, 2019, it was announced that Sears would be closing as part of a plan to close 96 stores nationwide. The store closed on February 15, 2020.

On January 7, 2020, it was announced that Macy's would also be closing in April 2020 as part of a plan to close 29 stores nationwide which left Burlington and JCPenney as the only anchors left.

On January 8, 2020, the mall was sold once again, this time to Hull Property Group.

In March 2020, the Chuck E. Cheese location closed permanently after 15 years of operation since 2005.

In 2022, Gardner Outlet Furniture relocated into the first floor or the former Macy's space and Launch Entertainment would be opening in the former Gardner Outlet Furniture space in 2023.

References

External links
 
 Vintage Real Estate

Shopping malls established in 1967
Shopping malls in Massachusetts
Buildings and structures in Worcester County, Massachusetts
Tourist attractions in Worcester County, Massachusetts
Hull Property Group